Garladinne is a village in Anantapur district of the Indian state of Andhra Pradesh. It is the mandal headquarters of Garladinne mandal in Anantapur revenue division.

Geography 
It has an average elevation of 315 metres (1,036 ft).

Demographics 
In the 2011 census, the village had a population of 7,766 (3,947 males and 3,819 females — a sex ratio of 968 females per 1,000 males). 889 were aged 0–6 years, of whom 507 were boys and 382 girls — a ratio of 754 per 1,000. The average literacy rate was 64.9% with 4,463 literates.

References 

Villages in Anantapur district
Mandal headquarters in Anantapur district